Libraries have been deliberately or accidentally destroyed or badly damaged. Sometimes a library is purposely destroyed as a form of cultural cleansing.

There are examples of libraries accidentally destroyed by human actions. Others were damaged by natural disasters like earthquakes, floods or accidental fires.

Library fires have happened sporadically through the centuries: notable examples are the destruction of the Library of Alexandria, the destruction of Library of Nalanda in India and the accidental burning of the Duchess Anna Amalia Library in Weimar, Germany. Causes vary from arson to the Sun's rays setting fire to leaflets through the action of a magnifying lens, as happened to a library in Northam, Devon.

Causes and prevention 
In earlier times mildew was considered a major problem in many libraries, and so the emphasis on library design was to increase air flow by, for example, leaving openings under the shelves in adjoining floors. In a fire the flames would be drawn from floor to floor by the air flow, leading quite easily to the destruction of a whole library rather than just a small part.

Advances in technology have reduced the possibility of a library collection being destroyed by fire. These include water sprinklers, fire doors, freezers, alarms, smoke detectors, suppression systems, and emergency generators. Older libraries are usually altered by closing up air flow openings and installing fire doors, alarms and sprinklers. Air conditioning reduces the mold problems. These are all essential parts of new library design.

There is no recovery possible if a book is burnt, so it is accepted that it is better to put out the fire with water and then dry out the books. As mold destroys paper, the books are frozen until they can be dried. This process will damage the book but not destroy it, and the information will be intact.

To reduce the chance of damage from fire, or other causes, and decrease the time needed for recovery after a destructive event, libraries need a disaster management and recovery plan. This can be an ongoing process which will include professional development following updates in technology for key staff, training for the remaining staff, checking and maintaining disaster kits, and review of the disaster plan.

In addition, fire-safety investigations are periodically carried out, especially for historical libraries. The Library of Congress, for example, underwent a year-long inspection beginning in 2000. Before the Congressional Accountability Act of 1995, the Library of Congress and all Capitol Hill buildings were exempt from safety regulations. Balancing historical preservation and contemporary safety standards proves to be a difficult task for "even a 12-year rehabilitation of LC completed in 1997 did not address many fire hazards".  After the Compliance Office inspection, however, the LC announced their wholehearted commitment "to achieving the highest level of safety possible" and "the Architect of the Capitol and Library of Congress will report their progress to the Office of Compliance every three months".

Information technology is another reason for careful fire protection. With so many computers in libraries there "is a decrease in floor space and an increase in more compact and powerful computer systems" which generate more heat and require the use of many more outlets, increasing the number of potential ignition sources. From as early as the 1950s the potential dangers of computer equipment, and the facilities that house them, was recognized. Thus in 1962 the National Fire Protection Association began developing the first safety standards specifically applicable to electronic computer systems.  This standard is called NFPA 75 Protection of Information Technology Equipment. FM Global Data Sheet 5–32 is another standard providing guidelines to protect against not only fire, but also water, power loss, etc.

Human action

Natural disasters

Fire

See also 
 Book burning
 List of book-burning incidents
 The Enemies of Books
 
 Library damage resulting from the 2004 Indian Ocean earthquake
 List of libraries damaged during World War II
 Planned destruction of Warsaw
 Siege of Sarajevo (1992–1996)
 List of destroyed heritage

Further reading 
 The Bosnian Manuscript Ingathering Project – A call for Bosnian manuscripts ingathering
 Polastron, Lucien X. (2007) Libros en Llamas: historia de la interminable destrucción de bibliotecas. Libraria, .
 Knuth, Rebecca. Libricide : the regime-sponsored destruction of books and libraries in the twentieth century. 
 Polastron, Lucien X. Books on fire: the destruction of libraries throughout history. 
 Civallero, Edgardo. When Memory Turns into Ashes... Memoricide During the XX Century. DOI.
 UNESCO. Lost Memory – Libraries and archives destroyed in the twentieth century
 Books on Fire: The Destruction of Libraries Throughout History. Lucien Xavier Polastron. Translated by John E Graham. Inner Traditions. . .
Ovenden, Richard Burning the Books. London: John Murray

References

External links 
 The Bosnian Manuscript Ingathering Project
 The threat to world heritage in Iraq: heritage destroyed

Lists of libraries
Historical negationism
Libraries
Destroyed
History of books
Book censorship